Atlas Arena is a multipurpose indoor arena in Łódź, Poland, opened on June 26, 2009 at al. Bandurskiego. It is one of the largest Polish venues with a seating capacity of 10,400, with an optional extra 3,000, it has 1,500 parking places and 11 VIP lounges (each with a terrace). The arena hosts conferences, concerts and sports events (e.g. volleyball, basketball, athletics and ice hockey). In August 2009, Atlas Group purchased the naming rights to the arena for a period of 5 years.

Events

Sports events
 CEV Champions League (PGE Skra Bełchatów as a host)
 2010 CEV Champions League Final Four
 Eurobasket Women 2011
 2012 CEV Champions League Final Four
 2014 FIVB Volleyball Women's World Championship qualification (CEV)
 2014 FIVB Volleyball Men's World Championship
 2019 Women's European Volleyball Championship

Concerts

See also
List of indoor arenas in Poland
Sport in Poland

References

External links

 

Indoor arenas in Poland
Indoor ice hockey venues in Poland
Sport in Łódź
Buildings and structures in Łódź
Sports venues in Łódź Voivodeship
Basketball venues in Poland
Volleyball venues in Poland
Boxing venues in Poland
Mixed martial arts venues in Poland